Brantingham Roman villa is a Roman villa and scheduled monument near Brantingham, East Riding of Yorkshire, England.

Villa
The villa site was discovered in 1941 at Cockle Pits stone quarry when two geometric mosaics were uncovered. Excavations in 1961 discovered the remains of the villa building, including a large room with a mosaic floor measuring 11.13 m x 7.77 m and a corridor which led to four other rooms. In 1983 a further series of excavations encountered  Iron Age ditched enclosures on the site followed by a series of rectangular buildings on the site dating from the 2nd century to the 4th century AD.

Mosaics
Two mosaics were discovered in 1941, recorded and reburied. In 1948 they were excavated and were due to be moved to the Hull and East Riding Museum. After they had been prepared for removal, the larger of the two mosaics was stolen and has never been recovered. A local rumour suggested that it had been loaded onto a military plane bound for America the next day. Both of the 1941 mosaics were decorated with geometric patterns; the stolen one measured 3.55 m x 2.05 m.

References

Villas in Roman Britain
Archaeological sites in the East Riding of Yorkshire
1941 archaeological discoveries
2nd-century establishments in Roman Britain
Collections of the Hull and East Riding Museum